Guo Yuan may refer to:

 Guo Yuan (Zini) (國淵), courtesy name Zini, official serving under the Han dynasty warlord Cao Cao
 Guo Yuan (Yuan Shang's subordinate) (郭援, died 202), official serving under the Han dynasty warlord Yuan Shang
 Guo Yuan (Zen monk) (born 1950), Vietnamese Buddhist monk